Tác is a village in Hungary. In the time of Roman Empire it was known as Gorsium-Herculia. An open-air museum presents the ruins.

External links 

 Street map 
 Aerial photography: Gorsium - Tác - Hungary
 GORSIUM later HERCULIA Hungary from The Princeton Encyclopedia of Classical Sites

Populated places in Fejér County
Roman settlements in Hungary